The 2006 Russian Cup Final decided the winner of the 2005–06 Russian Cup, the 14th season of Russia's main football cup. It was played on 19 May 2006 at the Luzhniki Stadium in Moscow, between CSKA Moscow and Spartak Moscow. CSKA Moscow emerged victorious with a 3—0 win thanks to two goals from Jô and a strike from Vágner Love.

As winners, CSKA Moscow qualified for the group stage of the 2006–07 UEFA Cup and also earned a birth in the 2007 Russian Super Cup against Spartak Moscow on 3 March 2007.

Match details

References

Russian Cup finals
Russian Cup
Cup
Cup
PFC CSKA Moscow matches
Russian Cup Final 2006